Yes, We Fuck! is a Spanish documentary film directed by Antonio Centeno and Raúl de la Morena in 2015. The title parodies the famous slogan of the 2008 presidential campaign of Barack Obama, yes, we can.

Plot 

The documentary explores the sexuality of people with functional diversity. Through six stories, different topics are addressed, including the experience of one's sexuality, life as a couple, postpornography, prostitution or sexual assistance among others.

The use of explicit sexual images aims to break with the hegemonic vision that keeps disabled people in a state of permanent infantilization, showing that not only they have desiring bodies which may also be desirable, but that these bodies can create new political imaginaries that redefine concepts such as masculinity, eroticism or even democracy.

Awards and festivals

References

External links
 Official website
 Full documentary with subtitles on Vimeo
 

2015 films
2015 documentary films
BDSM in films
Catalan-language films
Creative Commons-licensed documentary films
Documentary films about LGBT topics
Spanish erotic films
2010s feminist films
Films about disability
Spanish documentary films
2010s Spanish-language films
2015 LGBT-related films